The Cobra King of Kathmandu is the third novel in the Children of the Lamp trilogy by P. B. Kerr.  It was released in December 2006, in both the UK and USA.

References

 P.B. Kerr's website
 Scholastic website

Children of the Lamp
2006 novels